The Rural Municipality of Meadow Lake No. 588 is a rural municipality (RM) in the Canadian province of Saskatchewan within Census Division No. 17 and  Division No. 6.

History 
The RM of Meadow Lake No. 588 incorporated as a rural municipality on February 1, 1976.

Geography

Communities and localities 
The following urban municipalities are surrounded by the RM.

Cities
Meadow Lake

Villages
Dorintosh

The following unincorporated communities are within the RM.

Organized hamlets
South Waterhen Lake

The RM also surrounds several First Nations Indian reserves (Eagles Lake 165C, Flying Dust First Nation No. 105, Meadow Lake 105A, Thunderchild First Nation 115D, and Waterhen 130).

Demographics 

Government 
The RM of Meadow Lake No. 588 is governed by an elected municipal council and an appointed administrator that meets on the second Monday of every month. The reeve of the RM is Timothy McKay while its administrator is Gina Bernier. The RM's office is located in Meadow Lake.

References

External links 

M

Division No. 17, Saskatchewan